The 2009 Team Speedway Junior Polish Championship is the 2009 version of Team Speedway Junior Polish Championship organized by the Polish Motor Union (PZM). The defending Champion is Unia Leszno. The Final took place on 27 August 2009 at MotoArena Toruń in Toruń and was won by host team Unibax Toruń (41 points) where they beat Caelum Stal Gorzów Wlkp (38 points), Unia Leszno (33 points) and Marma Hadykówka Rzeszów (7 points).

Qualifications  
The draw for Qualifying Groups was made by Main Commission of Speedway Sport and was announced in "Komunikat Nr 20/2009" on 14 May 2009.

 Round 1: 27 May 2009
 Round 2: 9 July 2009
 Round 3: 30 July 2009
 Round 4: 13 August 2009

Group A

Group B

Group C

Group D

Final 
 The Final
 27 August 2009 (17:00 CEST)
 Toruń, MotoArena Toruń
 Referee: Wojciech Grodzki
 Best time: 59.16 - Kamil Pulczyński in Heat 8
 Attendance: 1,000

Dawid Lampart

See also 
 2009 Individual Speedway Junior Polish Championship
 2009 Team Speedway Polish Championship (2009 Speedway Ekstraliga)

References 

Team Junior